Ruth Margaret Richardson (born 13 December 1950) is a New Zealand retired politician of the National Party who served as Minister of Finance from 1990 to 1993. Her 1991 budget, which she dubbed the "Mother of all Budgets", formed the catalyst for her party's economic reforms known in the media as "Ruthanasia".

Richardson was a lawyer by profession. She was elected as the Member of Parliament (MP) for Selwyn in 1981. She supported and carried on the free-market reforms initiated by the preceding Labour Government, and extended them in a significant way with the Fiscal Responsibility Act 1994. Richardon's economic restructuring, including privatisation of state assets and cuts to social welfare, contributed to New Zealand emerging from its fiscal problems. However, critics have noted the wide-ranging effects on New Zealand's social fabric including child poverty along with wealth inequality, which were both severely exacerbated.

She later joined ACT New Zealand.

Early life
Richardson was born in southern Taranaki on 13 December 1950. Her father was active in the National Party's Patea branch. Richardson was brought up as a Roman Catholic, and after finishing primary school, was sent to Sacred Heart College, a Catholic girls' high school in Wanganui.

Richardson decided on a career in Parliament at an early age, before she even left high school. Sir Roy Jack, a National Party MP and a friend of her family, advised her to study law, which she did. Richardson gained a law degree from the University of Canterbury. After graduating, she worked for the Department of Justice. In 1975, Richardson married Andrew Wright, a colleague from the Department.

His  electorate was to become  because of post-census boundary changes. Besides alienating her from her old mentor, she also created considerable irritation in the higher ranks of the party, which frowned on challenges to sitting MPs who sought renomination. The party was especially hostile when the challenge was made against long-serving MPs such as Sir Roy Jack. George Chapman who chaired the selection said, "The tensions were tremendous, but Roy was finally confirmed as the candidate." She was a member of the non-partisan political lobby organisation the Women's Electoral Lobby.

In 1978, Richardson contested the National Party's nomination for the Tasman seat. She won the nomination, but in the 1978 election itself, she failed to defeat incumbent Labour MP Bill Rowling (who was leader of his party at the time). In 1980, she was invited to contest the nomination for Selwyn, a National safe seat just outside Christchurch which was held by retiring MP Colin McLachlan. She won the nomination, and in the 1981 election, was elected to Parliament.

Early parliamentary career

Richardson was influenced by the neo-liberal thought of Milton Friedman and Friedrich Hayek. She quickly distinguished herself in the National Party caucus as a supporter of free market economics, privatisation, and trade liberalisation. This contrasted considerably with the views held by National Party Prime Minister Robert Muldoon, who favoured an interventionist approach based on significant overseas borrowing. Richardson's focus on financial matters was itself a cause for comment, as many female MPs (particularly in the National Party) had confined themselves to matters such as health and social welfare.

When National lost the 1984 election, Richardson became a member of the Opposition. Richardson stood out in National's caucus for her strong support of the radical economic reforms of the Labour Party's new Finance Minister, Roger Douglas. These reforms, sometimes known as "Rogernomics", involved the privatisation of state assets, the removal of tariffs and subsidies, and applying monetarism to control inflation. These reforms were seen by many in the Labour Party as being against the traditional policies of the left-wing Labour Party, but were also opposed by the more conservative wings of the National Party. Particularly hostile were followers of Robert Muldoon, a traditionalist conservative who opposed free market reforms as undermining state authority.

Shortly after National's electoral loss, Jim McLay replaced Muldoon as leader of the National Party and he appointed Richardson education spokesperson. In February 1986 there was a considerable rearrangement of responsibilities in the opposition. People such as Bill Birch and George Gair, who McLay associated with the Muldoon era, were demoted. They were replaced by newer MPs, such as Richardson and Simon Upton, who McLay believed would help revitalise the party. This move proved fatal to McLay personally, however, as the sacked Birch and Gair allied themselves with McLay's rival, Jim Bolger. Bolger ousted McLay and became party leader.

The change in leadership was damaging for Richardson, as Bolger (and many of his allies) strongly disliked her. This dislike was due to three main factors: anger at McLay's "favouritism" towards her, dislike of her advocacy for radical free-market economic policies, and dislike of her personality (which many colleagues found "abrasive" and "condescending"). When George Gair (elevated for his role in Bolger's rise to power) retired from the position of deputy leader, Richardson stepped forward for the position. Bolger, however, made it clear that he strongly opposed Richardson's candidacy, instead throwing his support behind Don McKinnon. McKinnon narrowly defeated Richardson by just one vote and became deputy leader.

Bolger did, however, make Richardson the party's spokesperson on finance in recognition of her strong showing for the deputy leadership. This was an attempt to pacify Richardson and her supporters, rather than an expression of confidence in her – it was well known that Bolger himself preferred the more cautious Bill Birch for the finance role. The move to defuse tension was only partially successful, and hostility between supporters of Bolger and supporters of Richardson remained. Many National politicians believed that Richardson sought to replace Bolger as leader, but even if Bolger was vulnerable, the two factions that opposed him (one led by Richardson and the other led by Winston Peters) were unwilling to cooperate. Bolger's leadership remained secure, and when his popularity rose, the window of opportunity was lost.

When Richardson gave birth during a recess in the 1980s, she had a room in Parliament set aside for her to breastfeed in (although a creche was not established until the 1990s).

Minister of Finance
Many people believed that the National Party would adopt more cautious, conservative policies than the radical Labour government. On coming to office, however, the new Government was confronted with a much worse fiscal and economic position than the out-going Government had disclosed. In particular, the state-owned Bank of New Zealand required a multimillion-dollar recapitalization. The forecast budget surplus was quickly revised, upon National coming into office, to a large budget deficit. In response, the new government announced significant cuts to social welfare benefits, and reneged on National's 1990 election promise to remove the tax surcharge on superannuation (and even increased the rate of the surcharge from 20 to 25 per
cent and lowered the tax exemption threshold).

Whilst employment law reform had been expressed in the 1990 manifesto, many National Party supporters, and some of its parliamentary caucus, were disappointed at the continuation of the policies established by Douglas. Richardson's first Budget, which she had jokingly dubbed the "Mother of all Budgets"—a term that would haunt her political career—compounded this unpopularity, as it significantly cut state spending in many areas as an attempt to bring deficits under control. Her policies were widely known as "Ruthanasia".

While she remained Finance Minister for the whole three-year term of the first Bolger government, this was a period marked by increasing tension within the Cabinet. Tax policy was an area where Richardson and the more moderate members of the Cabinet often failed to agree even the basics.

In addition, Bolger and his allies had still not been reconciled with her. In order to partially reflect the strong discontent in the electorate with the reform process (National arguably only won because the opposition vote was split between three parties) Richardson lost her role as Minister of Finance, and was offered the role of Minister of Justice. Richardson refused, preferring to take a role on the back-benches then called a by-election. She was replaced by Bill Birch. In 1993, Richardson was awarded the New Zealand Suffrage Centennial Medal.

Legacy

Though her period as Finance Minister was comparatively short, Richardson's legacy in subjects such as fiscal responsibility and economic liberty is large. Many of the reforms she championed have endured and remain an example for a modern Public Financial Management. With the first public sector balance sheet produced it was used to avoid a double down-grade to the Sovereign credit rating. In fact, New Zealand remains the only country that has introduced modern accounting and integrated its balance sheet with the budget, as a tool for its budgeting, appropriations, and financial reporting. Since these public sector reforms, New Zealand has achieved and maintained significantly positive net worth, notwithstanding several shocks to the economy, including the financial crisis of 2007–2008 and the Christchurch earthquake in 2011, where most comparable governments like Australia and Canada, or larger countries such as the UK and US, have a negative net worth.

The 2021 New Zealand budget presented by the Sixth Labour Government boosted levels for beneficiaries by the highest amount in decades  in what was framed as a direct response to Richardson's 1991 "Mother of all Budgets" by largely restoring benefit levels. During the budget day speech, finance minister Grant Robertson pointed out that it had been 30 years since the 1991 budget saying that the 2021 budget would "address the most inequitable of the changes made 30 years ago." Prime Minister Jacinda Ardern who was 11 at the time of the 1991 budget commented that "On too many occasions in New Zealand’s history, the changes that leave an indelible mark on the next generation do so for the wrong reason." In response to the 1991 budget's legacy Richardson defended it saying "My budget was driven by a desire to lift economic growth and to make employment attractive." The cut in major benefits in the 1991 budget had long lasting effects on welfare and poverty in New Zealand. Benefits were effectively not raised until a small increase in 2016 under the Fifth National Government by finance minister  Bill English, with the 2020 and 2021 budgets largely restoring the pre 1991 levels. Richardson's cut in benefits is largely seen as having corresponded with an increase in long term general poverty and wealth inequality in New Zealand.

Subsequent career
Ruth Richardson resigned from parliament in the following year, being replaced by David Carter as MP by the 1994 Selwyn by-election.

She continued to be involved in politics through her advocacy of the ACT New Zealand party. ACT, established by Roger Douglas and his allies, promotes policies very close to those of Richardson. She has also a number of roles related to business and corporate governance, and served on a number of corporate boards. She is also a member of the Mont Pelerin Society, founded by economist Friedrich Hayek.

Canterbury University made her an honorary Doctor of Commerce in 2011.

See also
 Fourth National Government of New Zealand

References

Sources

External links

 New Zealand Productivity Commission: From output budgeting to social investment: reflections on thirty five years of evolution in public sector management in New Zealand
 Public Finance International: Balance sheets and fiscal policy – the New Zealand example , 11 October 2018
 Financial Times: Lessons from New Zealand on fiscal discipline, 11 October 2017
 The Economist: New Zealand Inc, 15 August 1992
 Ruth Richardson New Zealand Ltd
 

1950 births
Living people
New Zealand finance ministers
New Zealand National Party MPs
New Zealand Roman Catholics
New Zealand libertarians
20th-century New Zealand lawyers
University of Canterbury alumni
People from Taranaki
Women government ministers of New Zealand
Members of the New Zealand House of Representatives
Unsuccessful candidates in the 1978 New Zealand general election
New Zealand MPs for South Island electorates
Women members of the New Zealand House of Representatives
Recipients of the New Zealand Suffrage Centennial Medal 1993
Female finance ministers